Woodland is an unincorporated community in Madison Township, St. Joseph County, in the U.S. state of Indiana.

History
A post office was established at Woodland in 1856, and remained in operation until 1907. The community and its vicinity once contained many sawmills.

Geography

References

Unincorporated communities in St. Joseph County, Indiana
Unincorporated communities in Indiana